Cyclic nucleotide gated channel beta 3, also known as CNGB3, is a human gene encoding an ion channel protein.

See also
 Cyclic nucleotide-gated ion channel
 Stargardt disease

References

Further reading

External links
  GeneReviews/NIH/NCBI/UW entry on Achromatopsia
  OMIM entries on Achromatopsia
 

Ion channels